Colin William McFadyean (born 11 March 1943) is a former  international rugby union player and captain.

He was capped eleven times for England between 1966 and 1968, nine times as a centre and twice on the wing and captained England in his last two internationals in 1968. He scored four tries for England, including two in one game against  in March 1967, and also scored one dropped goal for England.

He was selected for the 1966 British Lions tour to Australia and New Zealand, playing in all four internationals against the All Blacks and scoring one try.

He played club rugby for Moseley.

References

1943 births
Living people
Alumni of Loughborough University
British & Irish Lions rugby union players from England
England international rugby union players
English rugby union players
Loughborough Students RUFC players
Moseley Rugby Football Club players
People educated at Plymouth College
Rugby union centres
Rugby union players from Tavistock
Rugby union wings
Staffordshire RFU players